Maksymilian Rylo, O.S.B.M. (21 September 1719 – 22 November 1793) was a Ukrainian Greek Catholic hierarch. He was an Eparchial Bishop of the Ruthenian Catholic Eparchy of Chełm–Belz from 1756 to 1785, Administrator of the Ruthenian Catholic Eparchy of Przemyśl, Sambir and Sanok from 1780 to 1785 and an Eparchial Bishop of the same Ruthenian Catholic Eparchy of Przemyśl, Sambir and Sanok from 1785 until his death in 1793.

Life 
Born in the family estate near Barysaw, Polish–Lithuanian Commonwealth (present day Minsk Region, Belarus) or, according another dates, in Rylivka, near Vilnius (present day Lithuania) in a noble Catholic family of Hieronim and Anna (née Miecznikowski) Rylo in 1719 or 1715.

Rylo joined the Monastery of the Holy Trinity in Vilnius of the Order of Saint Basil the Great in a young age, where he made a profession and was sent to complete a philosophical and theological studies in Rome in the Pontifical Urban University, where he ultimately earned a doctorate in sacred theology. He was ordained as a priest on 22 September 1742, in Rome.

After returning from Italy, he had a various pastoral assignments and served as superior and hegumen at the Basilian Institutes in the Polish–Lithuanian Commonwealth.

He was confirmed by the Holy See as an Eparchial Bishop of the Ruthenian Catholic Eparchy of Chełm–Belz on 15 November 1756. He was consecrated to the Episcopate on 24 February 1759. The principal consecrator was Metropolitan Florian Hrebnytskyi.

With his initiative, a seminary for the Greek Catholics was opened in Chełm in 1759. Also during the First Partition of Poland Bishop Rylo was imprisoned by Russian Government for some months in 1774.

He died in Przemyśl on 22 November 1793.

References 

1719 births
1793 deaths
People from Barysaw District
People from Vitebsk Voivodeship
Pontifical Urban University alumni
18th-century Eastern Catholic bishops
Bishops of the Uniate Church of the Polish–Lithuanian Commonwealth
Order of Saint Basil the Great
Prisoners and detainees of Russia
Bishops of Przemyśl